Abdel Ghani Guériguer (born 21 January 1970) is a Moroccan sprinter. He competed in the men's 4 × 400 metres relay at the 1992 Summer Olympics.

References

1970 births
Living people
Athletes (track and field) at the 1992 Summer Olympics
Moroccan male sprinters
Olympic athletes of Morocco
Place of birth missing (living people)